Teodomiro Alberto Azevedo Leite de Vasconcelos (Arcos de Valdevez, Portugal, 4 August 1944 – Johannesburg, South Africa, 29 January 1997) was a Mozambican journalist and  writer. He was a member of Associação dos Escritores Moçambicanos.

In 1945, he moved to Mozambique, where he took later the Mozambican citizenship. He spent his childhood in Beira and studied Social Sciences in Lourenço Marques. He worked for Rádio do Aeroclube da Beira and Rádio Clube de Moçambique, and in 1972, he moved to Portugal because of his positions against the colonial regime. In Portugal, he worked for Rádio Renascença.

He moved back to Mozambique after the independence of the country and worked as a journalist for the radio and several publications. Besides, he worked as a teacher and he was actor and political commentator. From 1981 to 1988, he was the administrator of Rádio Moçambique.

Works 
 Irmão do Universo, Maputo, Associação dos Escritores Moçambicanos, 1994
 Resumos, Insumos e Dores Emergentes, Maputo, Associação dos Escritores Moçambicanos, 1997
 Pela Boca Morre o Peixe, Maputo, Associação dos Amigos de Leite de Vasconcelos, 1999
 As Mortes de Lucas Tadeu, Coimbra, Cena Lusófona, 2000 -
 A Nona Pata da Aranha, Maputo, Promédia, 2004

In 2001,  Fernando Vendrell made a film based on his story O Gotejar da Luz.

References and external links 

 Ma-Schamba.com)
 PoetsOfMozambique.com www.poetsofmozambique.com

1944 births
1997 deaths
People from Arcos de Valdevez
Mozambican writers
Portuguese emigrants to Mozambique